The following is a list of international bilateral treaties between Australia and El Salvador

 Early treaties were extended to Australia by the British Empire, however they are still generally in force.

References

Treaties of Australia
Treaties of El Salvador